Thylacodes arenarius is a species of sea snail, a marine gastropod mollusk in the family Vermetidae, the worm snails or worm shells.

Description
The diameter of the round opening reach . The inner surface is smooth and shiny. These shells are cemented onto a hard surface and resemble the calcareous tubes of certain marine worms, for example worms in the polychaete family Serpulidae. The visible part of the body is red with cream markings. The foot of this mollusk is atrophied and it has lost its function of movement.

Distribution
This species can be found in the Mediterranean Sea - Eastern Basin and in the North Atlantic Ocean - European waters.

Synonyms
 Lemintina arenaria (Linnaeus, 1758)
 Lemintina selecta (Monterosato, 1878)
 Lemintina selecta var. arborea Monterosato, 1884
 Serpula arenaria Linnaeus, 1758 (original combination. Not Polychaeta, transferred to Vermetidae Mollusca)
 Serpulorbis arenarius (Linnaeus, 1758) 
 Serpulorbis polyphragma Sasso, 1827
 Serpulus arenarius var. gracilior Mörch, 1859 (infrasubspecific)
 Thylacodus polyphragma (Sasso, 1827)
 Thylacodus polyphragma var. aletes Mörch, 1862 (synonym)
 Vermetus arenarius (Linnnaeus, 1758)
 Vermetus arenarius var. minor Sacco, 1896 (junior primary homonym)
 Vermetus dentifer Lamarck, 1818 (synonym)
 Vermetus gigas Bivona in Philippi, 1836
 Vermetus gigas f. conglobatus Monterosato, 1892
 Vermetus gigas f. destitutus Monterosato, 1892
 Vermetus gigas var. angulatus Monterosato, 1880 (junior primary homonym)
 Vermetus gigas var. conglobata Monterosato, 1892 (synonym)
 Vermetus gigas var. destituta Monterosato, 1892 (synonym)
 Vermetus gigas var. minor Pallary, 1912 (junior primary homonym, permanently invalid)
 Vermetus gigas var. rufa Monterosato, 1892 (synonym)
 Vermetus gigas var. typica Monterosato, 1892 (synonym)
 Vermetus horridus Monterosato, 1892
 Vermetus horridus f. asperrimus Monterosato, 1892
 Vermetus horridus var. asperrima Monterosato, 1892 (synonym)
 Vermetus horridus var. minor Pallary, 1938 (junior primary homonym)
 Vermetus polyphragma (Sasso, 1827)
 Vermetus polyphragma f. anguinus Monterosato, 1892
 Vermetus polyphragma f. major Monterosato, 1892
 Vermetus polyphragma f. tortuosus Monterosato, 1892
 Vermetus polyphragma var. anguina Monterosato, 1892 (synonym)
 Vermetus polyphragma var. major Monterosato, 1892 (synonym)
 Vermetus polyphragma var. tortuosa Monterosato, 1892 (synonym)
 Vermetus scopulosus Monterosato, 1892
 Vermetus scopulosus f. discoideus Monterosato, 1892 (junior primary homonym)
 Vermetus selectus Monterosato, 1878
 Vermetus selectus f. ramosus Monterosato, 1892
 Vermetus selectus var. arborea Monterosato, 1892 (synonym)
 Vermetus selectus var. ramosa Monterosato, 1892 (synonym)
 Vermetus verrucosus Monterosato, 1892
 Vermicularia lineolata Gravenhorst, 1831 (subjective synonym)

References

 Linnaeus, C. (1758). Systema Naturae per regna tria naturae, secundum classes, ordines, genera, species, cum characteribus, differentiis, synonymis, locis. Editio decima, reformata. Laurentius Salvius: Holmiae. ii, 824 pp

Vermetidae
Gastropods described in 1758
Taxa named by Carl Linnaeus